Earl of Darlington is a title that has been created twice, each time in the Peerage of Great Britain. Baroness von Kielmansegg, half-sister of King George I, was made countess of Darlington in 1722. This creation was for life only, and so the title expired on her death in 1725.

The second creation came in 1754 in favour of Henry Vane, 3rd Baron Barnard, who became the first Earl of Darlington.
Henry Vane, 1st Earl of Darlington (c. 1705–1758)
Henry Vane, 2nd Earl of Darlington (1726–1792)
William Harry Vane, 3rd Earl of Darlington (1766–1842)

In 1833 Lord Darlington was created Duke of Cleveland.
William Harry Vane, 1st Duke of Cleveland (1766–1842)
Henry Vane, 2nd Duke of Cleveland (1788–1864)
William John Frederick Vane, 3rd Duke of Cleveland (1792–1864)
Harry George Powlett, 4th Duke of Cleveland (1803–1891)

In fiction
The Earl of Darlington was a character in Kazuo Ishiguro's novel The Remains of the Day. He was the lord of Darlington Hall. Among his employees were the butler Stevens, his father and the housekeeper Miss Kenton. During the 1930s, the Earl hosted numerous conferences and secret meetings between Germany, the United Kingdom, and other European powers in Darlington Hall. The Germans manipulated the Earl so that he persuaded the British government to negotiate the appeasement peace treaty in its favour, which eventually resulted in the outbreak of the Second World War.  The Earl died in the early 1950s. Afterwards, his heirs auctioned off Darlington Hall and all of its belongings in order to raise money to pay for death duties and other taxes.

The novel was adapted into a 1993 film by Merchant Ivory Productions starring Anthony Hopkins as Stevens and Emma Thompson as Miss Kenton. Lord Darlington was played by James Fox.

References

Extinct earldoms in the Peerage of Great Britain
Noble titles created in 1722
Noble titles created in 1754